Federal Route 218, or Jalan Lama Bentong–Raub, is a federal road in Pahang, Malaysia. The roads connects Raub in the north to Bentong in the south. This stretch used to be a part of Federal Route 8. The Kilometre Zero (KM0) of the Federal Route 218 starts at Bentong.

History

The route was first constructed in 1887 as part of the Kuala Kubu Bharu-The Gap-Kuala Lipis road, where a southern extension was built from Teranum to Bentong in 1915, which became the first section of what was later part of the original Federal Route 8 to be built. The Bentong-Teranum-Raub section was then bypassed by straighter super two highway running through FELDA Lurah Bilut, causing this old, winding section to be re-gazetted as the Federal Route 218.

Features
At most sections, the Federal Route 218 was built under the JKR R5 road standard, allowing maximum speed limit of up to 90 km/h.

List of junctions

Gallery

References

Malaysian Federal Roads